Duke Williams may refer to:

Duke Williams (musician), American musician
Duke Williams (safety) (born 1990), American football safety
Duke Williams (wide receiver) (born 1993), American football wide receiver